Yegor Vladimirovich Yakovlev (Russian: Егор Владимирович Яковлев; 14 March 1930 – 18 September 2005) was one of the founders of Mikhail Gorbachev and Boris Yeltsin's policy of glasnost, and one of the most respected Russian journalists.

He graduated from Moscow's History and Archives Institute in 1954. In 1966, he became an editor-in-chief of the Sovietskaya Pechat journal which was later renamed Journalist. In 1968, he continued his career in journalism as a special correspondent with the Izvestia newspaper. He worked in Prague for three years during that period, and returned there as a resident correspondent in 1985-1986. In August 1986, he was appointed editor-in-chief of the Moscow News, which he turned from an English-language voice of Soviet propaganda into one of the most popular and widely read papers of the era of perestroika and glasnost. In 1991-1992, he was the chairman of All-Soviet Television Company (VGTRK). In 1993, he became a publisher of Obschaya Gazeta which he sold in 2002. Yakovlev won several international awards, including John Paul II medal. He also authored several books.

His son Vladimir is also a journalist; he is a founder and an editor-in-chief of the Kommersant Newspaper, the first Russian daily business-oriented newspaper.

References

1930 births
2005 deaths
Recipients of the Order of Honour (Russia)
20th-century Russian journalists